Donnington is a small housing estate in Oxford, England located adjacent to the River Thames in the post-war housing developments either side of Donnington Bridge and around Boundary Brook Road. It is bordered by Iffley Village to the south, Iffley Fields to the north and Cowley to the east.

References

Areas of Oxford
Housing estates in Oxfordshire